Kearsney is:

Kearsney, Kent, a village in the United Kingdom
Kearsney railway station in Kearsney, Kent
Kearsney College, a private boarding school for boys in South Africa